Sialkot Junction railway station is the main railway station in Sialkot on the Wazirabad–Narowal Branch Line.

History
Sialkot Junction station was opened in 1880, following the inauguration of the Sialkot–Jammu Branch Line. In 1905, Wazirabad–Narowal Branch Line was completed and connected Sialkot to Karachi and Peshawar.

Services
The following trains stop/terminate/originate at Sialkot Junction station:

See also

 List of railway stations in Pakistan
 Pakistan Railways
 Sialkot
 Sialkot International Airport

References

Railway stations in Sialkot District
Railway stations opened in 1880
Railway stations on Wazirabad–Narowal Branch Line
Transport in Sialkot